Apateopholis (meaning "confusing scale") is a genus of prehistoric ray-finned fish.

References
 

Prehistoric aulopiformes
Prehistoric ray-finned fish genera